Hasan İpek (born 1959) is a Turkish bureaucrat who served as the 11th Governor of Şırnak from 2013 to 2015, having been appointed by President Abdullah Gül on the recommendation of the Turkish Government. He previously served as the 9th Governor of Bayburt from 2011 to 2013. He is a former advisor to the Prime Minister of Turkey. He is a former Kaymakam (Sub-Governor of a district).

Early life and career
Born in 1959 in Karabük, İpek graduated from Istanbul University Faculty of Law and served as the Kaymakam of the districts of İnebolu, Cide, Koyulhisar and Aralık. He has also served as the Deputy Governor of İzmir, Kütahya and Burdur. He worked at the Ministry of the Interior and became an advisor to the Prime Minister of Turkey before being appointed as the 9th Governor of Bayburt in 2011. He served until 2013, after which he served as the 11th Governor of Şırnak until 2015. He has since become a Central Governor.

He is married with three children.

See also
Governor (Turkey)
List of Turkish civil servants
Ministry of the Interior (Turkey)

References

External links
Website of the Governor of Bayburt
Website of the Governor of Şırnak

Living people
People from Karabük
1959 births
Turkish civil servants
Istanbul University Faculty of Law alumni